Rosenvilde High School is a high school at Kolsås in Bærum municipality in the Viken (county) of Norway.

The school offers an education within the general trades, restaurants and food processing, health and social care and media and communications, and in addition, supplementary school courses in general subjects. It is the closest school to Asker offering art education.

External links 
Schools homepage

Bærum
Education in Viken (county)
Secondary schools in Norway